Manuel Chagas was a Portuguese Olympic fencer. He competed in the individual and team épée events at the 1948 Summer Olympics.

References

External links
 

Year of birth missing
Possibly living people
Portuguese male épée fencers
Olympic fencers of Portugal
Fencers at the 1948 Summer Olympics